The Museo nazionale d'arte medievale e moderna della Basilicata is an art museum located inside the building Palazzo Lanfranchi, which is located in Piazzetta Pascoli, in the Historic Centre of Matera Basilicata, Italy. In front of the entrance, a sculpture by artist Kengiro Azuma titled La Goccia is exhibited.

In the past, the building that now hosts the museum - Palazzo Lanfranchi - used to be a seminary and, starting from 1864, it became the seat of the high school Liceo ginnasio Emanuele Duni, which now is located uptown.

See also
 Matera
 Basilicata
 Liceo ginnasio Emanuele Duni

Notes

Art museums and galleries in Matera
National museums of Italy
Palaces in Matera